Miquel Olmo Forte (born 20 January 1966) is a Spanish retired footballer who played as a forward, and a current manager.

Club career
Born in Terrassa, Barcelona, Catalonia, Olmo played for lower league teams always in his native region, most notably representing Terrassa FC and CF Gavà. He retired in 1998, aged 32, playing for UE Poble Sec.

Manager career
Olmo began his managerial career at lowly CD Can Perallada and subsequently managed neighbours CD Montcada and UE Vilassar de Mar, before moving to Segunda División B's UE Figueres in the 2005 summer. He helped the Unió to narrowly avoid relegation, finishing 14th.

On 4 June 2009, after a stint at UE Castelldefels, Olmo replaced Javi Salamero at the helm of Girona FC. He remained in charge for the last three matches of the campaign, helping the Albirrojos retain their Segunda División status.

On 25 September 2009 Olmo was appointed Terrassa FC's manager, replacing fired José Luis García. However, he finished the season as dead last, being relegated to Tercera División. He remained on the bench in the following years, leaving the club in May 2012.

On 5 July 2013, Olmo was named Salamero's assistant at CE Sabadell FC. On 28 November, after Salamero's dismissal, Olmo was appointed caretaker manager.

After taking the Arquelinats out of the relegation places, Olmo renewed his deal with the club on 8 May 2014. He was dismissed on 23 November.

On 24 July 2015 Olmo was appointed manager of Bahrain's Manama Club. He was relieved from his duties on 29 October.

Personal life
Olmo's sons, Carlos and Dani, also became footballers. The former played in the lower leagues of Croatia for teams including GNK Dinamo Zagreb's reserves, while the latter played for their first team and was capped internationally for Spain.

References

External links
Gavà player profile 

Soccerway profile

1966 births
Living people
Footballers from Terrassa
Spanish footballers
Association football forwards
Terrassa FC footballers
CF Gavà players
CE Premià players
Spanish football managers
Segunda División managers
UE Figueres managers
Girona FC managers
Terrassa FC managers
CE Sabadell FC managers
Spanish expatriate football managers
Spanish expatriates in Bahrain
Expatriate football managers in Bahrain
EC Granollers players